Paulin may refer to:
Paulin (name), a given name and surname
Paulin, Dordogne, a commune in Aquitaine, France
Paulin, Masovian Voivodeship, a settlement in Poland

See also
Paulins Kill, a river in New Jersey, United States
Saint-Paulin, Quebec, a municipality in Canada
Saint-Paulin cheese, a French cheese